Alex Christopher Pedersen (born July 17, 1969) is an American politician serving as a member of the Seattle City Council for District 4. He was previously an aide to city councilmember Tim Burgess and a private sector housing finance analyst.

Early life and education

Pedersen was born and raised in Baltimore, Maryland. After earning a Bachelor of Arts degree in history from James Madison University, Pedersen graduated from the University of Pennsylvania with a master's degree in government administration.

Career

Early career 
He joined the Presidential Management Fellows Program during the Clinton administration and worked on homelessness and community development programs for the U.S. Department of Housing and Urban Development under Secretary Andrew Cuomo. Pedersen was an aide to the Oakland City Council and a housing finance analyst for Bank of America and Alliant Capital before joining Seattle politics.

From 2012 to 2014, Pedersen was a legislative aide to Seattle City Council President Tim Burgess, who later ran for mayor. He also wrote a neighborhood newsletter focusing on Northeast Seattle affairs called "4 to Explore" that was later shut down. Pedersen left his position in Burgess's office to join real estate firm CBRE as an affordable housing financial analyst.

Seattle City Council

Pedersen identifies as a progressive Democrat, although he has also been described as a "pro-business moderate."

After declining to run for the newly-created District 4 in the 2015 election, Pedersen announced his candidacy in November 2018. District 4 was named the key swing district in the city council race after the resignation of incumbent Rob Johnson, with Pedersen characterized as a conservative candidate among the primary field. He opposed the Move Seattle and Sound Transit 3 transportation referendums as well as the construction of bicycle lanes on 35th Avenue Northeast in District 4.

Pedersen won 40 percent of the vote in the primary and advanced to the general election alongside Shaun Scott, a Democratic Socialist writer and organizer. The two candidates took opposing sides in issues presented as debates, with Pedersen favoring the removal of homeless camps and reconsideration of the city's plans for neighborhood upzoning. His campaign received financial support from the Seattle Metropolitan Chamber of Commerce's political action committee and an endorsement from The Seattle Times.

Pedersen won the election with 52 percent of the vote and was sworn in on November 26, 2019, replacing interim member Abel Pacheco Jr. His victory was credited to strong support in wealthier neighborhoods at the east edge of the district, while Scott earned more votes in the University District and Roosevelt. Pedersen was assigned as the chair of the council's Transportation and Utilities Commission, which was the subject of criticism from transportation advocacy groups based on his comments on previous referendums.

In January 2023, Pedersen announced that he would not see re-election to a second term. The Seattle Times described his first term voting record as being "consistently more centrist than his more left-leaning peers".

Personal life

Pedersen lives in the Ravenna neighborhood of Northeast Seattle with his wife and two children.

References

Living people
Politicians from Baltimore
Seattle City Council members
University of Pennsylvania alumni
Bank of America people
American financial analysts
21st-century American politicians
1969 births